Henry Goodwin Grazebrook (24 February 1810 – 17 December 1868) was an English cricketer with amateur status. He was associated with Cambridge University and made his first-class debut in 1828. He was educated at Winchester College and Jesus College, Cambridge. He became a solicitor at Chertsey.

References

1810 births
1868 deaths
English cricketers
English cricketers of 1826 to 1863
Cambridge University cricketers
People educated at Winchester College
Alumni of Jesus College, Cambridge